The South Branch Trout River is a tributary of the Trout River, flowing successively in Belvidere and in Montgomery, in Lamoille County and in Franklin County, in northern Vermont in the United States.

The valley of the South Branch Trout River is served by South Main Street (VT 118) passing on the eastern shore of the river.

The surface of the South Branch Trout River is usually frozen from mid-December to mid-March, except the rapids areas; however, safe circulation on the ice is generally from late December to early March.

Course
The South Branch Trout River rises at an unidentified Lake in Lamoille County. This lake is encased between the mountains.

  towards north in a deep valley of Lamoille County, entering in Franklin, up to an unidentified brook (coming from south-west);
  towards north in a deep valley, following more or less the route route 118, collecting two brooks from east and three from west, up to Pacific Brook (coming from east);
  towards the north, forming a hook to the west and a loop to the east near Hectorville, collecting three brooks from east and three from east, up to Tamarack Brook (coming from southwest);
  towards the north going forming a loop towards east before Hutchins Bridge Road, collecting three brooks from east and one brook from east, up to the mouth.

The mouth of the Trout River is emptying on the southwest shore of Trout River on the south side of Montgomery Center. From there, the current goes generally northwest on  following the Trout River; then, westward on  up to eastern shore of Lake Champlain.

Toponymy 
The toponym "South Branch Trout River" was registered on October 29, 1980 in the USGS (US Geological Survey).

See also
List of rivers of Vermont

References

Rivers of Vermont
Rivers of Lamoille County
Rivers of Franklin County, Vermont
Wild and Scenic Rivers of the United States